Simon Simon (born in Vaux de Cernay either in 1720 or 1735, near Rambouillet; died after 1788 in Dreux) was a French harpsichordist and composer.

Biography

Most of the accounts of his life derive from the recollections of Jean-Benjamin de La Borde, in his .

Youth
At the age of seven, he was entrusted to his uncle Butet, organist at an abbey near Caen. It is remarked that "the mediocrity of the master’s talents spread to the progress of the pupil". At age thirteen, his harpsichord skills were noticed by the Marquise de la Mézangère, a pupil of François Couperin. In 1747 she decided to take him in at her Paris  to teach him the harpsichord while the violinist Saint-Saire taught him music. He later went on to study composition with Antoine Dauvergne.

Career
Louis XV gave Simon Simon the role of harpsichord teacher to the heirs to the throne, and later also the Queen Marie Leszczyńska and the Countess of Artois. He married a Mademoiselle Tardif, pupil of Le Tourneur, who became his assistant. Throughout the reign of Louis XVI he remained at Versailles. He survived the French Revolution, and retired to Montfort-l'Amaury and then to Dreux.

Works
Simon Simon published three books of harpsichord pieces, between 1776 and 1770, although some of these also include lines for the violin and cello. These are among the last books of harpsichord in France, alongside Jacques Duphly and Jean-Jacques Charpentier.

The Bibliothèque nationale de France also holds a manuscript for a treatise on accompaniment, entitled , likely for his own pupils.

Pièces de Clavecin, Op. 1

Simon's Opus 1 collection of accompanied keyboard music was published in 1761, and contains six suites. He describes his interest in uniting the French and Italian styles of keyboard music, which had been a common concern for many of the French harpsichordists of the 18th century. Its overall organization has been described as "appear[ing] to be an exercise in alternating contrasts between the French and Italian styles", and evokes many different genres of the mid-18th century late Baroque.

In his first Book, Simon breaks with tradition by using multiple keys in a single suite, and incorporates sonata-like violin and cello lines into some of the harpsichord movements. He explains his rationale in a preface:

The individual suites comprise:
 Suite No. 1, in E minor
 La Mézangère, Allemande 
 Sarabande 
 Légèrement et détaché

 Suite No. 2, in A
 La Saint Saire, with violin
 Airs tendres, with violin
 Allegro, with violin
 La Magnanville, Ière Gavotte, IIe Gavotte
 La Tyrconell, Pantomime (in D major)
 La D’Eaubonne

 Suite No. 3
 La Fontaine (G major) 
 La Moriceau, Minuet & Four Variations (F major) 
 La de Nangis, Musette (C minor) 
 La de Broglie, Minuets (C major/minor)
 La de Villemeur, with violin (F major)

 Suite No. 4 (with violin) La de Croisœuil
 Introduction (F minor/major) 
 Andante (F minor) 
 Vif (F major)

 Suite No. 5
 La La=Corée (E-flat minor) 
 La L’arrard (G minor)
 La Le Daulceur (E-flat major)

 Suite No. 6: Concerto que l’on peut Excecuter avec un Violon Seul (violon & violoncelle), La La Font
 Presto (G major) 
 Gavottes (D major/minor)
 Vif (G major) 
 La de Poyanne (D minor) 
 La de Guibeville. Air gay (A major)

See also
List of French harpsichordists

References

External links
 

French Classical-period composers
Composers for harpsichord
French harpsichordists
French male classical composers
18th-century classical composers
18th-century French composers
18th-century French male musicians
19th-century French male musicians